The 1979 Tasmanian state election was held on 28 July 1979 in the Australian state of Tasmania to elect 35 members of the Tasmanian House of Assembly. The election used the Hare-Clark proportional representation system — seven members were elected from each of five electorates. The quota required for election was 12.5% in each division.

The incumbent Labor Party, led by Doug Lowe, won a third term in office against the opposition Liberal Party, led by Max Bingham.

Background
Bill Neilson, leader of the Labor Party and Premier of Tasmania, had retired on 1 December 1977 and been replaced by Doug Lowe.

The United Tasmania Group, which had contested the two previous elections, did not field any candidates for the 1979 election. Instead a new party, the Australian Democrats, founded by Don Chipp in 1977, emerged as the most significant minor party.

Results

The Labor Party won the election, increasing its majority in the House of Assembly from one seat to five.

Doug Lowe received the highest personal vote ever in the House of Assembly: 24,971 or 51.2% of the vote in the seat of Franklin.

|}

Distribution of votes

Primary vote by division

Distribution of seats

Aftermath
Max Bingham resigned as opposition leader after losing his second election, and was replaced by Geoff Pearsall.

The election of three Labor MPs for Denison (Julian Amos, John Devine and John Green) was ruled invalid, due to the enforcement of a previously ignored rule limiting campaign expenditure to $1,500. A by-election was arranged for Denison in February 1980. The placement of the Labor candidates on the ballot paper, which placed Deputy Premier Neil Batt fourth, was believed to have led to the introduction of the Robson Rotation method of randomising ballot ordering.

See also
 Members of the Tasmanian House of Assembly, 1979–1982
 Candidates of the 1979 Tasmanian state election

References

External links

Elections in Tasmania
1979 elections in Australia
1970s in Tasmania
July 1979 events in Australia